Cyperus pachycephalus is a species of sedge that is native to New Guinea.

See also 
 List of Cyperus species

References 

pachycephalus
Plants described in 1952
Flora of New Guinea
Taxa named by Johannes Hendrikus Kern